Robert is an ancient Germanic French surname. It is derived from the Proto-Germanic elements *Hrōþi- ("fame, glory, honour") and *berhta- ("bright, shining"). Despite being used as a surname, it is most commonly used as a given name (see Robert).

Geographical distribution
As of 2014, 27.0% of all known bearers of the surname Robert were residents of France (frequency 1:472), 22.8% of Tanzania (1:434), 10.6% of Nigeria (1:3,177), 6.0% of the United States (1:11,438), 3.7% of Canada (1:1,926), 2.9% of Papua New Guinea (1:534), 2.5% of Malawi (1:1,335), 2.2% of Kenya (1:3,929), 2.1% of Rwanda (1:1,018), 1.9% of Togo (1:721), 1.3% Haiti (1:1,631), 1.2% of Belgium (1:1,822), 1.2% of Liberia (1:722), 1.1% of Sudan (1:6,756) and 1.1% of South Africa (1:9,780).

In France, the frequency of the surname was higher than national average (1:472) in the following regions:
 1. Réunion (1:56)
 2. Collectivity of Saint Martin (1:119)
 3. Saint Pierre and Miquelon (1:337)
 4. Pays de la Loire (1:369)
 5. Brittany (1:378)
 6. Bourgogne-Franche-Comté (1:414)
 7. Centre-Val de Loire (1:420)
 8. Auvergne-Rhône-Alpes (1:432)
 9. Nouvelle-Aquitaine (1:471)

People with the surname
Alain Robert, French rock and urban climber
Hubert Robert, French painter
Jeanne Robert (1914–2017), French Resistance member
Laurent Robert, French footballer
Louise Robert (born 1941), Canadian painter
Léo-Paul Robert, Swiss painter
Louis-Léopold Robert, Swiss painter
Luis Robert, Cuban baseball outfielder for the Chicago White Sox
Mireille Robert (born 1963), French politician
Rene Robert, star National Hockey League forward for the Buffalo Sabres
Robert brothers, Anne-Jean and Nicolas-Louis, French balloonists circa 1783–4, the engineers who built the world's first hydrogen balloon and went on to build the world's first manned hydrogen balloon

See also
Roberts (surname)
Surnames from given names

References

French-language surnames
Germanic-language surnames